Malmen Airbase  is a military airbase located in Malmslätt, Linköping Municipality, Östergötland County, Sweden.

The base was opened by Carl Cederström in 1912. In the beginning the airbase had only three aircraft but more were bought in the same year. From 1926 to 1974 it served as an air force base for the Östgöta Wing (F 3). In 1974 the Wing was decommissioned, and the airbase was put under Bråvalla Wing (F 13) then later Uppland Wing (F 16). From 1998 it served as main base for the Swedish Armed Forces helicopter units, with the Swedish Armed Forces Helicopter Wing.

From 2003 the Royal Swedish Airschool has been located here, to train pilots with Sk 60 jet trainers. The Swedish Air Force Museum is located on the airbase.

Facilities 

See also 
 Swedish Armed Forces
 Swedish Air Force
 List of military aircraft of Sweden

References

External links
 
 

Buildings and structures in Östergötland County
 
1912 establishments in Sweden
Military installations established in 1912
Linköping Garrison